Mister Mo, Lover Ko is a 1999 Philippine romantic comedy film directed by Joel Lamangan. The film stars Glydel Mercado, Gary Estrada, Eddie Gutierrez and Elizabeth Oropesa. It is a remake of the 1975 film Mister Mo, Lover Boy Ko, where Oropesa was among the leading stars. It was one of the entries in the 1999 Manila Film Festival.

The film is streaming online on YouTube.

Cast
 Glydel Mercado as Maita
 Gary Estrada as Noel
 Eddie Gutierrez as Ford
 Elizabeth Oropesa as Melody
 Samantha Lopez as Jenny
 Danny Ramos as Reagan
 Dexter Doria as Dra. Dumalaga
 Luz Valdez as Aling Andrea
 Sheila Marie Rodriguez as Dina
 Dedes Whitake as Gemma
 Jessette Prospero as Mrs. Calixto
 Tessie Villarama as Dina's Mother-in-Law
 Jerry O'Hara as Maita's Father
 Tony Mabesa as Priest
 Boots Basi as Alice
 Joanne Alano as Cory
 Gerald Ejercito as Gerry
 J.B. Villavert as John
 Richard Quan as Aries
 Jim Pebanco as Red
 Ogie Francisco as Ogie
 J.R. Rosales as JR

Awards

References

External links

Full Movie on Solar Pictures

1999 films
Filipino-language films
Philippine romantic comedy films
Crown Seven films
Films directed by Joel Lamangan